FCBS may refer to:

 Fairfax County Board of Supervisors, in Virginia, United States
 Fulham College Boys' School, in London
 Sibiti Airport, in the Republic of the Congo

See also 
 FCB (disambiguation)